Muchaki Kosa   is an Indian politician. He was elected to the Lok Sabha, the lower house of the Parliament of India from Bastar, Madhya Pradesh as an  Independent.

References

Independent politicians in India
Lok Sabha members from Madhya Pradesh
India MPs 1952–1957